San Fernando Airport may refer to:

 San Fernando Airport (Argentina), serving San Fernando
 San Fernando Airport (Chile), serving San Fernando
 San Fernando Airport (Philippines), serving San Fernando City

See also
 Las Flecheras Airport, serving San Fernando de Apure, Venezuela